Cape Darlington is an ice-covered headland which rises to , forming the south side of the entrance to Hilton Inlet, on the east coast of Palmer Land. It was discovered in 1940 by the United States Antarctic Service (USAS), but at that time it was thought to be an island. Its true nature was determined in an aerial flight by the Ronne Antarctic Research Expedition (RARE) under Finn Ronne, in November 1947. It was named by the USAS for Harry Darlington III, a member of the East Base sledging party that explored this coast as far south as Hilton Inlet. Darlington was also a member of the RARE.

References
 

Headlands of Palmer Land